Daniel Sandoval Navarro (born 5 April 1991) is a Mexican professional boxer.

Professional career
On July 10, 2010, Sandoval beat prospect Ramón Álvarez by technical knockout on the Televisa Deportes undercard of Álvarez vs. Cuello.

His next fight was a win over veteran Crispin Martinez for the vacant Mexican Pacific Coast welterweight title.

Professional record

|- style="margin:0.5em auto; font-size:95%;"
|align="center" colspan=8|34 wins (30 knockouts, 4 decisions), 2 losses, 0 draws
|- style="margin:0.5em auto; font-size:95%;"
|align=center style="border-style: none none solid solid; background: #e3e3e3"|Res.
|align=center style="border-style: none none solid solid; background: #e3e3e3"|Record
|align=center style="border-style: none none solid solid; background: #e3e3e3"|Opponent
|align=center style="border-style: none none solid solid; background: #e3e3e3"|Type
|align=center style="border-style: none none solid solid; background: #e3e3e3"|Round
|align=center style="border-style: none none solid solid; background: #e3e3e3"|Date
|align=center style="border-style: none none solid solid; background: #e3e3e3"|Location
|align=center style="border-style: none none solid solid; background: #e3e3e3"|Notes
|-align=center
|Win || 34-2 ||align=left| Richard Gutierrez
|UD || 8 || September 28, 2013 ||align=left| StubHub Center, Carson, California, U.S.
|align=left|
|-align=center
|Win || 33-2 ||align=left| Claudinei Lacerda
|UD || 10 || May 24, 2013 ||align=left| Tijuana, Mexico
|align=left|
|-align=center
|Win || 32-2 ||align=left| Martin Avila
|TKO || 2  || February 9, 2013 ||align=left| Mexico City, Mexico
|align=left|
|-align=center
|Win || 31-2 ||align=left| Larry Smith
|UD || 6 || December 15, 2012 ||align=left| Toyota Center, Houston, Texas, U.S.
|align=left|
|-align=center
|Win || 30-2 ||align=left| Felipe Mota
|UD || 10 || October 27, 2012 ||align=left| Apozol, Mexico
|align=left|
|-align=center
|Win || 29-2 ||align=left| Gabriel Martinez
|KO || 5  || August 11, 2012 ||align=left| Complejo Panamericano, Guadalajara, Mexico
|align=left|
|-align=center
|Win || 28-2 ||align=left| Enrique Colin
|KO || 6  || June 7, 2012 ||align=left| Las Pulgas, Tijuana, Mexico
|align=left|
|-align=center
|Win || 27-2 ||align=left| Michel Rosales
|TKO || 5  || April 14, 2012 ||align=left| Mexico City Arena, Mexico City Mexico
|align=left|
|-align=center
|Win || 26-2 ||align=left| Jose Maria Valdez
|KO || 4  || March 3, 2012 ||align=left| Auditorio Municipal, Tijuana, Mexico
|align=left|
|-align=center
|Win || 25-2 ||align=left| Juan Jesus Rivera
|KO || 2  || January 21, 2012 ||align=left| Coliseo Olimpico de la UDG, Guadalajara, Mexico
|align=left|
|-align=center
|Win || 24-2 ||align=left| Felipe Gonzalez
|KO || 4  || December 16, 2011 ||align=left| Arena Jalisco, Guadalajara, Mexico
|align=left|
|-align=center
|Win || 23-2 ||align=left|Jorge Silva
|TKO || 10  || October 8, 2011 ||align=left|Auditorio Municipal, Tijuana, Mexico
|align=left|
|-align=center
|Win || 22-2 ||align=left|Ricardo Martinez
|KO || 1  || August 27, 2011 ||align=left|Auditorio Benito Juarez, Guadalajara, Mexico
|align=left|
|-align=center
|Win || 21-2 ||align=left|Isaac Garcia
|TKO || 1  || June 18, 2011 ||align=left|Musica Hall, Toluca, Mexico
|align=left|
|-align=center
|Win || 20-2 ||align=left|Wily Medina
|KO || 3  || February 12, 2011 ||align=left|Coliseo Olimpico, Guadalajara, Mexico
|align=left|Won Jalisco State welterweight title
|-align=center
|Loss || 19-2 ||align=left|Armando Robles
|UD || 6 || November 27, 2010 ||align=left|Tijuana, Mexico
|align=left|
|-align=center
|Win || 19-1 ||align=left|Jonathan Coronado
|TKO || 1  || October 2, 2010 ||align=left|Coliseo Olimpico, Guadalajara, Mexico
|align=left|
|-align=center
|Win || 18-1 ||align=left|Crispin Martinez
|TKO || 3  || August 20, 2010 ||align=left|Arena Jalisco, Guadalajara, Mexico
|align=left|Won Mexican Pacific Coast welterweight title
|-align=center
|Win || 17-1 ||align=left|Rodrigo Escatel
|KO || 1  || August 6, 2010 ||align=left|Arena Coliseo, Guadalajara, Mexico
|align=left|
|-align=center
|Win || 16-1 ||align=left|Ramón Álvarez
|TKO || 2  || July 10, 2010 ||align=left|Arena VFG, Guadalajara, Mexico
|align=left|Won Jalisco welterweight title
|-align=center
|Win || 15-1 ||align=left|Jesus Velasco
|TKO || 1  || June 4, 2010 ||align=left|Coliseo Olimpico, Guadalajara, Mexico
|align=left|
|-align=center
|Win || 14-1||align=left|Felipe Gonzalez
|TKO || 2  || May 14, 2010 ||align=left|Arena Coliseo, Guadalajara, Mexico
|align=left|Won WBC Mundo Hispano Youth welterweight title
|-align=center
|Win || 13-1 ||align=left|Ivan Rivas
|KO || 3  || April 9, 2010 ||align=left|Arena Jalisco, Guadalajara, Mexico
|align=left|
|-align=center
|Win || 12-1 ||align=left|Martin Ramiro
|RTD || 3  || April 3, 2010 ||align=left|Coliseo Olimpico, Guadalajara, Mexico
|align=left|
|-align=center
|Win || 11-1 ||align=left|Nicolas Avalos
|TKO || 1  || March 12, 2010 ||align=left|Arena Jalisco, Guadalajara, Mexico
|align=left|
|-align=center
|Win || 10-1 ||align=left|Luis Barragan
|TKO || 1  || February 27, 2010 ||align=left|Coliseo Olimpico, Guadalajara, Mexico
|align=left|
|-align=center
|Win || 9-1 ||align=left|Ivan Rodriguez
|TKO || 1  || February 6, 2010 ||align=left|Panamericano, Guadalajara, Mexico
|align=left|
|-align=center
|Win || 8-1 ||align=left|Agustin Rodriguez
|KO || 3  || December 19, 2009 ||align=left| Jalpa, Mexico
|align=left|
|-align=center
|Loss || 7-1 ||align=left|Ivan Perez
|TKO || 5  || November 20, 2009 ||align=left|Arena Jalisco, Guadalajara, Mexico
|align=left|For Jalisco State light welterweight title
|-align=center
|Win || 7-0 ||align=left|Genaro Contreras
|TKO || 1  || October 12, 2009 ||align=left|El Cabezon, Ameca, Mexico
|align=left|
|-align=center
|Win || 6-0 ||align=left|Gustavo Lupercio
|TKO || 1  || September 16, 2009 ||align=left|Arena Coliseo, Yahualica, Mexico
|align=left|
|-align=center
|Win || 5-0 ||align=left|Lorenzo Juarez
|TKO || 3  || August 22, 2009 ||align=left|Casino Casablanca, Tala, Mexico
|align=left|
|-align=center
|Win || 4-0 ||align=left|Justino Medina
|KO || 2  || August 1, 2009 ||align=left|Casino Casablanca, Tala, Mexico
|align=left|
|-align=center
|Win || 3-0 ||align=left|Demetrio Pantoja
|TKO || 1  || July 17, 2009 ||align=left|Club Leones, Ameca, Mexico
|align=left|
|-align=center
|Win || 2-0 ||align=left|Jeronimo Almaguer
|TKO || 1  || June 27, 2009 ||align=left|Club Leones, Ameca, Mexico
|align=left|
|-align=center
|Win || 1-0 ||align=left|Agustin Rodriguez
|KO || 2  || June 7, 2009 ||align=left|Palenque Gallos, Talpa de Allende, Mexico
|align=left|
|-align=center

References

External links

Boxers from Jalisco
Sportspeople from Guadalajara, Jalisco
Welterweight boxers
1991 births
Living people
Mexican male boxers